Porky's is a video game released for the Atari 2600 in 1983 by 20th Century Fox. It is based on the 1981 film Porky's. An Atari 8-bit family version was published by Romox on cartridge.

Gameplay

The player controls the film character Pee Wee as he attempts to blow up Porky's Bar. In order to do this, Pee Wee must collect a series of objects which are hidden inside a shower room.

To access the shower room, the player must first try to get Pee Wee across a five-lane highway without getting hit, similar to the game mechanic in Frogger. If something touches Pee Wee before he can cross the street, he is dropped into the swamp below Porky's. From there, he must build a ladder by retrieving blocks atop two platforms. To get onto the platforms, Pee Wee must use a pole to hoist himself up. Once he gets enough blocks, he can climb into the shower room from below.

The shower room consists of a series of ladders that Pee Wee must climb to retrieve the objects while a girl showers. If Pee Wee crosses into the girl's line of sight at any time, the film character Ms. Balbricker will appear and begin chasing after him. Pee Wee must move the object from atop the shower down through a hole in the floor and climb out of the room through an opening at the top. If Ms. Balbricker "latches onto" him, or if Pee Wee steps into the hole in the floor, he falls back into the swamp and must try again. However, this time he is only allowed to vault onto the leftmost platform while Porky's brother, the local sheriff, is standing on the right platform and will remain there for each subsequent time Pee Wee falls. Despite this new hazard, Pee Wee does not have to rebuild the ladder.

Once Pee Wee successfully retrieves the object, the process repeats itself until he has found the necessary number of objects. For each object he retrieves, one lane of the highway is cleared and he cannot be harmed by anything in it. After all the objects have been dropped into the hole, play moves to a scaffold where Pee Wee tries to reach the roof of the bar while Porky waits for him down below. The scaffold must be climbed in a specific manner and resets every time Pee Wee makes a mistake. If he misses a step, Pee Wee falls onto the ground where Porky catches him and tosses him back into the swamp.

To win, Pee Wee must find the correct path up the scaffold and avoid Porky. If he does, he is taken to an area with a plunger. All that must be done here is for Pee Wee to jump on the plunger, which creates an explosion and causes Porky's to sink into the swamp.

Reception
Yahoo Entertainment derided the game, saying "Good god, there was even a Porky's game. ... But it sure is fun to look back at which games [based on movies] actually worked and which games were Porky's."

References

External links

1983 video games
Atari 2600 games
Atari 8-bit family games
ColecoVision games
Fox Video Games games
Video games based on films
Video games developed in the United States